Larisa Yevgenyevna Lazutina (née Ptitsyna, born 1 June 1965) is a Soviet-Russian former professional cross-country skier.

Career
Lazutina was awarded the Holmenkollen medal in 1998 (shared with Fred Børre Lundberg, Alexey Prokurorov and Harri Kirvesniemi). She made her Olympic debut in 1988. Lazutina won her first Olympic medal in 1992, winning a team gold that year. At the 1994 Winter Olympics, Lazutina won a further relay gold. At the 1998 Winter Olympics in Nagano, Japan, she won five medals: three gold, one silver and one bronze. She was the most successful athlete at the 1998 Winter Games. After the Olympics, Boris Yeltsin awarded her the title Hero of the Russian Federation.

Lazutina earned numerous medals at the FIS Nordic World Ski Championships. She won a total of sixteen medals, including eleven gold, three silver and two bronze medals. She was also the first three-time winner of the women's 30 km event at the Holmenkollen ski festival (1995, 1998 and 2001).

In 2002, at her fifth Olympics, she again participated in the cross-country skiing events at the 2002 Winter Olympics. Lazutina won two medals with a gold in the 5 km + 5 km combined pursuit and a silver in the 10 km classical. However, she was one of three cross-country skiers (together with Johann Mühlegg and Olga Danilova) who were disqualified after blood tests indicated the use of darbepoetin, a drug intended to boost red blood cell production.

In February 2004, the International Olympic Committee stripped Lazutina's 2002 Olympic medals following a Court of Arbitration for Sport ruling in December 2003. The results were amended accordingly. As a result of the use of the banned substance, Larisa Lazutina received a two-year ban by the International Ski Federation in 2002.

In 2015, a sports park named after Lazutina opened in Odintsovo, Moscow region. Its full name is: .

Cross-country skiing results
All results are sourced from the International Ski Federation (FIS).

Olympic Games
 7 medals – (5 gold, 1 silver, 1 bronze)

World Championships
 16 medals – (11 gold, 3 silver, 2 bronze)

a.  Cancelled due to extremely cold weather.

World Cup

Season titles
 4 titles – (2 overall, 2 long distance)

Season standings

Individual podiums
21 victories 
62 podiums

Team podiums
 33 victories 
 41 podiums

Note:  Until the 1999 World Championships and the 1994 Olympics, World Championship and Olympic races were included in the World Cup scoring system.

Personal life
She is married to cross-country skier Gennady Lazutin.

See also
 List of sportspeople sanctioned for doping offences
 List of multiple Olympic gold medalists
 List of multiple Olympic gold medalists in one event

References

External links
 
 Holmenkollen medalists – click Holmenkollmedaljen for downloadable pdf file 
 Holmenkollen winners since 1892 – click Vinnere for downloadable pdf file 
 Pravda On-line
 IOC Announces Annulment of the Results of Larissa Lazutina from the 2002 Salt Lake City Olympic Winter Games and Amends Results Accordingly

1965 births
Living people
People from Kondopoga
Cross-country skiers at the 1988 Winter Olympics
Cross-country skiers at the 1992 Winter Olympics
Cross-country skiers at the 1994 Winter Olympics
Cross-country skiers at the 1998 Winter Olympics
Cross-country skiers at the 2002 Winter Olympics
Doping cases in cross-country skiing
Heroes of the Russian Federation
Holmenkollen medalists
Holmenkollen Ski Festival winners
Soviet female cross-country skiers
Russian female cross-country skiers
Olympic cross-country skiers of the Soviet Union
Olympic cross-country skiers of the Unified Team
Olympic cross-country skiers of Russia
Olympic gold medalists for the Unified Team
Olympic gold medalists for Russia
Olympic silver medalists for Russia
Olympic bronze medalists for Russia
Olympic medalists in cross-country skiing
Competitors stripped of Winter Olympics medals
FIS Nordic World Ski Championships medalists in cross-country skiing
FIS Cross-Country World Cup champions
Soviet sportspeople in doping cases
Russian sportspeople in doping cases
Medalists at the 1998 Winter Olympics
Medalists at the 1994 Winter Olympics
Medalists at the 1992 Winter Olympics
Sportspeople from the Republic of Karelia